Michael or Mike Mitchell may refer to:

Arts and entertainment
E. Michael Mitchell (1922–2009), Canadian painter and animation artist
Mike Mitchell (actor) (born 1982), American actor, comedian, and writer
Mike Mitchell (director) (born 1970), American film director
Mike Mitchell (musician) (1959–2021), singer and guitarist with The Kingsmen
Mike Mitchell (drummer) (born c. 1995), American drummer

Sports
Michael Mitchell (Australian rules footballer) (born 1961), Australian football player
Mike Mitchell (baseball) (1879–1961), American baseball player
Mike Mitchell (basketball, born 1956) (1956–2011), American basketball player in the NBA and Europe
Mike Mitchell (basketball, born 1967), American basketball player in Australia and Europe
Mike Mitchell (cornerback) (born 1961), American football cornerback
Mike Mitchell (cricketer) (1843–1905), English cricketer
Mike Mitchell (ice hockey) (1893–1942), Canadian ice hockey goaltender
Mike Mitchell (safety) (born 1986), American football safety

Others
Mike Mitchell (Ohio politician), former Ohio Representative
Mike Kanentakeron Mitchell, Canadian Mohawk politician, film director and lacrosse executive
Michael C. Mitchell (born 1946), American planner, designer, lecturer and environmentalist
Michael P. Mitchell (1925–2017), American politician in Idaho